Vestal Springs is an unincorporated community in Custer County, in the U.S. state of South Dakota.

The nearby spring has the name of Frank Vestal, a cattleman who settled there.

References

Unincorporated communities in Custer County, South Dakota
Unincorporated communities in South Dakota